FK Sitno Banská Štiavnica is a Slovak association football club located in Banská Štiavnica. It currently plays in 4. Liga.

Colors and badge 
Its colors are white-blue and yellow

Notable players 
The following notable players had international caps for their respective countries. Players whose name is listed in bold represented their countries while playing for Sitno Banská Štiavnica. 

 Lukáš Tesák

References

External links
Official website 

Football clubs in Slovakia
Association football clubs established in 1904
Sitno Banska Stiavnica